The Byzantine civil war of 1352–1357 was an armed conflict resulting from and concluding the Byzantine civil war of 1341–1347. The war opposed Byzantine emperor John V Palaiologos to John VI Kantakouzenos and his eldest son Matthew Kantakouzenos. John V emerged victorious as the sole emperor of the Byzantine Empire, but the resumption of civil war left the Byzantine state in ruins.

Background 
In the aftermath of the 1341–1347 conflict, John VI Kantakouzenos established himself as senior emperor and tutor over the young John V Palaiologos. This state of affairs, however, was not destined to last; supporters of the Palaiologoi still distrusted him, while his partisans would have preferred to depose the Palaiologoi outright and install the Kantakouzenoi as the reigning dynasty. Kantakouzenos' eldest son, Matthew, also resented being passed over in favour of John V and had to be placated with the creation of a semi-autonomous appanage covering much of western Thrace, which doubled as a march against the new Serbian Empire of Stephen Dushan.

Steadily deteriorating relations between Matthew, who now ruled eastern Thrace, and John V, who resided in western Thrace, sowed the seeds for the resumption of the civil war.

The war 
Open warfare broke out in 1352, when John V, supported by Venetian and Serbian troops, launched an attack on Matthew Kantakouzenos. John Kantakouzenos came to his son's aid with 10,000 Ottoman troops who retook the cities of Thrace, liberally plundering them in the process. In October 1352, at Demotika, the Ottoman force met and defeated 4,000 Serbians provided to John V by Dushan. This was the Ottomans' first victory in Europe. Two years later, their capture of Gallipoli marked the beginning of the Ottoman conquest of the Balkans, culminating a century later in the Fall of Constantinople. Meanwhile, John V fled to the island of Tenedos, from where he made an unsuccessful attempt to seize Constantinople in March 1353. 

John VI Kantakouzenos responded by having Matthew crowned as co-emperor, but John V Palaiologos, enlisting Genoese support and relying on the declining popularity of Kantakouzenos, succeeded in entering the capital in November 1354. John VI Kantakouzenos abdicated and retired to a monastery. Matthew held out in Thrace, making war upon the Serbians in 1356. Then, Matthew gathered an army of 5,000 Turks and marched on Serres, the Serbian-held capital of John Ugleisha. Stephen Urosh V, whose mother also ruled at Serres, decided to raise an army to defend his mother. In 1357, when Matthew and his Turks attacked, the Serbian army under Vojin, Count of Drama (a major fortress in that vicinity) came to the rescue and the Turks were defeated. Matthew was captured and held hostage until his ransom was paid by John V Palaiologos who was now the sole master of a rump state. Matthew was allowed to go to the Morea and reign there with his brother Manuel.

References

Sources

1350s conflicts
Civil War
Civil War 1352
Medieval Thrace
1352
Wars involving the Ottoman Empire
Wars involving medieval Serbian states
1350s in the Ottoman Empire
1357